Homero Aridjis (born April 6, 1940) is a Mexican poet, novelist, environmental activist, journalist, former ambassador and ex-president of PEN International, known for his rich imagination, poetry of lyrical beauty, and ethical independence.

Family and early life
Aridjis was born in Contepec, Michoacán, Mexico, on April 6, 1940, to a Greek father and a Mexican mother; he was the youngest of five brothers. His father fought in the Greek army during World War I and the Greco-Turkish War, when his family was forced to flee from their home in Tire, southeast of Smyrna, in Asia Minor. His mother grew up in Contepec amidst the turmoil of the Mexican Revolution. After nearly losing his life at age ten in a shotgun accident, Aridjis became an avid reader and began to write poetry. In 1959 he was awarded a scholarship at the Rockefeller Foundation-supported Mexico City Writing Center (Centro Mexicano de Escritores), the youngest writer to have received the award in the center's 55-year history.

Aridjis has published 50 books of poetry and prose, many of them translated into a dozen languages. His achievements include: the Xavier Villaurrutia Award for best book of the year for Mirándola dormir, in 1964, the youngest writer to receive the prize; the Diana-Novedades Literary Prize for the outstanding novel in Spanish, for Memorias del nuevo mundo, in 1988; and the Grinzane Cavour Prize, for best foreign fiction, in 1992, for the Italian translation of 1492, Vida y tiempos de Juan Cabezón de Castilla. 1492: The Life and Times of Juan Cabezón of Castile was a New York Times Notable Book of the Year. He received the Prix Roger Caillois in France for his poetry and prose and Serbia's highest literary honor, the Smederevo Golden Key Prize, for his poetry. In 2005 the state of Michoacán awarded him the first Erendira State Prize for the Arts. Recently he received three poetry prizes in Italy: the Premio Internazionale di Poesia 2013, Premio Letterario Camaiore and the Premio Internazionale di Poesía Elena Violani Landi, Centro di Poesia Contemporanea, University of Bologna (2016);Premio Letterario Internazionale L'Aquila (2019).

Twice the recipient of a John Simon Guggenheim Memorial Fellowship, Aridjis was named Doctor Honoris Causa by Indiana University.

He has been a visiting professor at Indiana University, New York University and Columbia University, and held the Nichols Chair in Humanities and the Public Sphere at the University of California, Irvine. He has been an editorial page columnist at the Mexican newspapers La Jornada, Reforma and El Universal since 1985, publishing hundreds of articles about environmental, political and literary topics.

Homero Aridjis has served as Mexico's ambassador to the Netherlands and Switzerland and to UNESCO in Paris. For six years between 1997 and 2003 he was President of PEN International, the worldwide association of writers.

Personal life

In 1965, Aridjis married Betty Ferber. They have two daughters, Eva Aridjis, a filmmaker in New York City (Niños de la calle, La Santa Muerte, The Favor, The Blue Eyes, "Chuy, el hombre lobo") and writer Chloe Aridjis, in London (Asunder, Book of Clouds, Sea Monsters. Topografía de lo insólito).

Critical appreciation

Octavio Paz: "In the poetry of Homero Aridjis there is the gaze, the pulse of the poet, the discontinuous time of practical and rational life and the continuity of desire and death: there is the poet's primal truth."
Kenneth Rexroth: "He is a visionary poet of lyrical bliss, crystalline concentrations and infinite spaces... I can think of no poet of Aridjis' generation in the Western Hemisphere who is as much at ease in the blue spaces of illumination – the illumination of transcending love. These are words for a new Magic Flute." (Introduction to "Blue Spaces")
Juan Rulfo: "The poetry of Homero Aridjis is a symbol of love. His work is very beautiful, above all, his style is very original, very novel."
Guillermo Sucre: "All his poetry – ever since "Antes del reino" (1963)-- is a continual conquest of splendor."
Seamus Heaney: "Homero Aridjis' poems open a door into light."
Mirándola dormir:
Joaquín Marco: "Mirándola dormir" is one of the most beautiful, profound and invigorating love poems in our language."
José Miguel Oviedo: "Mirándola dormir" is a work of exceptional intensity and beauty. An admirable poetic prose has been the ideal channel for this erotic crossing. Handled with perfect control of its rhythms, its internal breathing and the precise integrity of its sounds, it has shown the voice of the Mexican poet in all its deep singularity."
Persephone:
André Pieyre de Mandiargues: "This vast poem in prose which is narrative but never stops being poetic, which is realistic but always fantastical, is a unique book in contemporary literature. The power of this poem, or of this scandalous and fascinating illumination, is incomparable."
Harvard Bookshelf: "A dazzling work of literature in any tradition, or language, by any standards."
Le Nouvel Observateur: "Aridjis reinvents the multiplicity of language with rare mastery. This poetical form gives the story a new and splendid dimension."
1492: The Life and Times of Juan Cabezón of Castile:
The New York Times Book Review: "Succeeds in magisterially recreating that woeful and bizarre period of Spanish history that prefigured the discovery and conquest of America. The overall effect is one of splendidly rendered originality and authenticity... Swarms of minor characters cannot fail to remind us of classics like Cervantes' Don Quixote or of certain canvases by Velázquez or El Greco."
The Times Literary Supplement: "An extraordinary account of religious persecution in the fifteenth century. The sense of menace and threat that Aridjis conjures up is extraordinary."
La Quinzaine Litteraire: "This superb book reads like the wind, like an epic chronicle. Homero Aridjis retrieves, through the miracle of his magical prose, the very essence of the twilight of Spain."
Le Soir (Brussels): "With 1492, Homero Aridjis has achieved a novel of exceptional grandeur."
The Guardian (England): "A book of remarkable imaginative power, a looming shadow of a book, a pit and a pendulum all in one, measuring and burying, remorselessly bizarre. It is impossible not to respect the eloquence which Aridjis brings to lives facing the threat of sudden death at every point and the subtlety with which he insists that the death of the spirit is more terrible than anything that may befall the body."
Espaces Latino-Américains (Michel Schneider): "1492 - Les Aventures de Juan Cabezón de Castille and 1492" – "Mémoires du Nouveau Monde": "Le diptyque sur et autour de 1492 constitue une fresque romanesque monumentale et exceptionnelle, qui place Homero Aridjis au premier plan de la littérature hispanique et latino-américaine d'aujourd'hui ».
The Lord of the Last Days: Visions of the Year 1000:
The Washington Post (James Reston): "The test is 'whether the past is convincingly imagined and vividly evoked'. That is what Homero Aridjis accomplishes so brilliantly in this phantasmagoric, luminous novel, The Lord of the Last Days: Visions of the Year 1000."
Giuseppe Bellini: "Through the two currents of his fiction, with historical background and futuristic themes, Aridjis has brought and is bringing a contribution to Hispano-American narrative which places him among the greatest authors of the 20th Century."
Moctezuma:
Luis Buñuel: "It's perfect. It's a very profound and strange play. I think the author is completely surrealist, which for me is great praise."
El último Adán (The Last Adam)":
Luis Buñuel: "That the apocalypse will be the work of man and not of God is, for me, an absolute certainty. Therein lies the difference between the apocalyptic delirium of The Last Adam and Saint John's mediocre apocalyptic descriptions. Obviously, man's imagination has been enriched over the centuries."
Los invisibles:
Alberto Manguel: "Contemporary literature in Spanish generally lacks the voluptuousness and richness evident in Los Invisibles. It too often chooses between exacerbated realism and a kind of free-for-all fantasy. Aridjis, on the contrary, can use all kinds of voice, showing absolute mastery in all, and an astonishing narrative virtuosity. If "Los Invisibles" had to claim a lineage, it would be that of Voltaire's Contes philosophiques, Umberto Eco's Foucault's Pendulum and (because of its literary humour) Marcel Aymé's "La tête des autres."
J. M. G. Le Clézio: "After reading the novel, I believe it will be impossible to walk the streets of Paris without feeling surrounded by invisibles forces."
Solar Poems:
Yves Bonnefoy: "A great flame passes through the words, the poetry of Homero Aridjis, who sets reality alight in images that at once illuminate and consume it, making life a sister of dream. Homero is a great poet; our century has great need of him." (Preface to "Les poemes solaires")
Quincy Troupe: "Solar Poems" constantly serves up an exhilarating feast of wonderfully evocative images and metaphors that are also daring, cutting edge, full of surprises, often irreverent, historical, but sensual --- even erotic... Aridjis' poetry is full of love and a profound wonder for all of the universe and its inhabitants --- humans, animals, the earth, the seas, the sky and the sun and the moon. Solar Poems is a beautiful and necessary collection of poems by a wise poet at the peak of his powers."
News of the Earth:
Robert F. Kennedy Jr.: "Aridjis's new book covers more than thirty years of fighting to preserve our natural wonders. It will be an inspiration to future generations."
Jacob Scherr, NRDC: "Homero is one of the planet's great environmental heroes." 
Lester Brown, founder of Worldwatch and Earth Policy Institutes: "No one in Mexico has made a more important contribution to protecting the country's environment, an effort that has had ripple effects throughout the world."
Alejandro Jodorowsky: "The Group of 100 is a movement of conscience that strives to change our relationship with nature. Thanks to this group, presided over by the saintly poet Homero Aridjis, in our world we can still enjoy the magic of monarch butterflies, sea turtles and gray whales."
J.M.G. Le Clézio: "The great strength of Aridjis's work is the faith it transmits in a creative virtue of the world, pessimism notwithstanding, and in the possibility of saving it thanks to environmentalism. Aridjis's writings are not gratuitous; they are militant. Their source is the reality of the natural world."
Pierce Brosnan: "Our journey together to visit those great gentle creatures [gray whales] was one I will live with forever."
Serge Dedina, founder-director of Wildcoast:"News of the Earth can be read as a chronicle of the history of environmental activism in Mexico, but its scope reaches beyond Mexico, as so many of the issues featured are shared with the United States and Canada, its North American partners in NAFTA, and the world...It is an invaluable contribution to understanding why we must preserve our global environment."
Smyrna in Flames:
Stephanos Papadopoulos: "[T]he book's power is unmistakable. It lies in its indelible images, and in the very fact that Homero Aridjis, named after the greatest poet of Ionia, returns to his own bloody history by rewriting his father's memoirs, by giving the dead a voice, by returning the story to its owners. It is a bleak, terrifying, undeniably moving accomplishment."

Environmental activism

Aridjis is increasingly renowned as one of Latin America's leading environmental activists. As a child, he would often walk up a hillside behind his village to watch the migrating monarch butterflies. As he grew older logging thinned the forest and his concern for the fate of the butterflies and the trees triggered his earliest public defense of the environment.

In March 1985 Aridjis founded and became president of the Group of 100, an association of prominent artists and intellectuals, including Octavio Paz, Juan Rulfo, Rufino Tamayo, Gabriel García Márquez, Álvaro Mutis, Augusto Monterroso, Francisco Toledo, Leonora Carrington, Mathias Goeritz, Manuel Álvarez Bravo, Elena Poniatowska and others, devoted to environmental protection and the defense of biodiversity in Mexico and Latin America. Under his leadership the Group of 100 achieved in 1986 the official decree ensuring protection for the forests where the migratory monarch butterfly overwinters and in 1990 a permanent ban on the capture and commercialization of all seven species of sea turtle in Mexico. The Group was able to thwart the building of dams on the Usumacinta River that would have flooded 500 square kilometers of the Lacandon forest and submerged important Mayan ruins. For five years Aridjis spearheaded the defense of San Ignacio Lagoon, the gray whale nursery in Baja California, successfully preventing Mitsubishi and the Mexican government from building the world's largest solar salt works at the lagoon. Thanks to Aridjis and the Group of 100 the government agreed to publish daily reports of air quality in Mexico City, leaded gasoline was phased out and lead content in pottery drastically reduced, construction of an airport extension which would have obliterated a bird and wildlife sanctuary in Lake Texcoco was halted, thousands of tons of powdered milk contaminated by fallout from Chernobyl were returned to Ireland before they could be distributed in Mexico and a program limiting the circulation of cars in Mexico City one day each week was put into practice by the city government.

In 1991 he conceived of, organized and presided over the first "Morelia Symposium: Approaching the Year 2000", an international gathering of more than 40 prominent writers, scientists, environmentalists and representatives of indigenous peoples, to discuss the state of the planet and to establish a network for international cooperation. Among the participants were J. M. G. Le Clézio, Sherwood Rowland, Petra Kelly, Gert Bastian, Peter Raven, Lester Brown, and Augusto Roa Bastos.

In 1992 he presented the Morelia Declaration, a statement on the environment signed by more than 1000 writers and scientists from 66 countries, at the Earth Summit in Rio de Janeiro, where he spoke at the Global Forum with the Dalai Lama, Petra Kelly, Tom Hayden, Ted Turner and Jane Fonda, among others.

In 1994 he organized and presided over the second "Morelia Symposium: Approaching the Year 2000". Among the participants were J. M. G. Le Clézio, Rita Dove, Kjell Espmark, Bärbel Bohley, Bei Dao, W. S. Merwin, John Ralston Saul, Bill McKibben and Breyten Breytenbach. The Second Morelia Declaration was presented at the United Nations International Conference on Population and Development in Cairo in 1994. Aridjis obtained funding for both meetings from the Rockefeller Foundation.

In 2000 he organized and presided over "The Earth in the Year 2000", a joint International PEN—UNESCO symposium of writers and scientists in alliance for sustainable development.

As a pioneer of Mexican civil society, Aridjis played a crucial role in raising environmental awareness and promoting public participation for solving environmental problems, as well as defending freedom of expression about environmental matters.

Public service

While still in his thirties Homero Aridjis served as Mexico's ambassador to the Netherlands and Switzerland. In 1980 he founded the Michoacán Institute of Culture, and as its Director General held an historic international poetry festival, established public libraries throughout the state, founded Mexico's first Museum of Mexican Masks, oversaw restoration of historical buildings, the recovery and restoration of colonial art, protection of cultural heritage, and promotion of cultural diversity in traditional celebrations throughout the state of Michoacán.

Besides the Morelia (Michoacan) Festival in 1981, Aridjis also organized and presided over two international poetry festivals in Mexico City, in 1982 and 1987, bringing to Mexico poets such as Jorge Luis Borges, Seamus Heaney, Günter Grass, Vasko Popa, Allen Ginsberg, Kazuko Shiraishi, Ted Hughes, Lawrence Ferlinghetti, Andrei Voznesensky, João Cabral de Melo Neto, Katerina Anghelaki-Rooke, Lars Forssell, Marin Sorescu, Tadeusz Różewicz, André du Bouchet, Eliseo Diego, Mazisi Kunene, Günter Kunert, Breyten Breytenbach, W. S. Merwin, Rita Dove and Paul Muldoon.

In 1997, a coalition of seventeen centers led by American, Japan, Swedish and Belgian (Dutch-speaking) PEN nominated Aridjis for International President of the worldwide association of writers, and he was elected President at the International PEN Congress in Edinburgh, winning a second three-year term at the Moscow Congress held in 2000. He is the first PEN President living in Latin America. During his presidency he oversaw a complete revision of PEN's constitution, achieved acceptance of Spanish as PEN's third official language and led the organization in bettering its governance and accountability. In 2003 he was elected International PEN President Emeritus.

From April 2007 until the abolition of the post in January 2010 he was Mexico's ambassador to UNESCO, where he was a staunch defender of human rights, freedom of expression and cultural diversity and an outspoken critic of lack of transparency and accountability in the UNESCO bureaucracy.

While Aridjis was Mexico's ambassador to UNESCO, he was the driving force behind UNESCO's decision to name Mexico's Monarch Butterfly Biosphere Reserve a UN World Heritage Site.

Teaching activities

Visiting professor, Indiana University, Bloomington, 1969.
Visiting professor, New York University, 1969-1971.
Visiting professor and writer-in-residence, Columbia University, 1979-1980.
Nichols Chair in Humanities and the Public Sphere at the University of California, Irvine, 2002.
Poetry workshop at the Social Security Institute in Mexico City from 1986-1988.
Inaugural J.H. Tans Lecture, University of Limburg, Maastricht, The Netherlands, 1991.
Cecil Green Distinguished Visiting Professor, University of British Columbia, Vancouver, Canada, 1993.
Professor, "The Contemporary Novel" at Salzburg Seminar Session 354, Salzburg, Austria.
Writer-in-Residence, The Sweet Briar Seminars 1999-2000 International Writers, Sweet Briar College, Sweet Briar, Virginia.
Professor, Bennington Writing Seminar, Bennington College, Vermont, 2002.
Rachel Carson Distinguished Lecture, Florida Gulf Coast University, Fort Myers, Florida, 2007.

Awards and honors

As a writer:
Fellowship from the Mexican Writers' Center (1959–60)
Xavier Villaurrutia Prize for best book of the year, for Mirándola dormir (1965)
Chosen by Henry Kissinger to take part in the International Seminar for Politics and Humanities, Harvard University, 1966.
John Simon Guggenheim Memorial Fellowship (1966–1967 and 1979–1980)
French government fellowship (1966–1968)
Guest of the Berliner Kunstlerprogramm of the Deutscher Akademischer Austauschdienst in West Berlin (1986 and 1988).
Diana-Novedades Prize for Memorias del Nuevo Mundo, for the outstanding novel in Spanish (1988)
Grinzane Cavour Prize for 1492, Vida y Tiempos de Juan Cabezón de Castilla, best foreign novel translated into Italian, 1992
1492: Life and Times of Juan Cabezón of Castile, New York Times Notable Book of the Year
Doctor Honoris Causa in Humanities, Indiana University (1993)
Residency at the Rockefeller Foundation's Bellagio Study and Conference Center, Bellagio, Italy. (1994 & 2010)
Festival de Poesía Ramón López Velarde, Zacatecas, Mexico, held in his honor, 1995.
Prix Roger Caillois for the ensemble of his work as a poet and novelist, France (1997)
Smederevo Golden Key for Poetry, Serbia (2002)
First Erendira State Prize for the Arts, Michoacán, Mexico (2005).
Premio Internazionale di Poesia 2013, Premio Letterario Camaiore, Italy
Premio Internazionale di Poesía Elena Violani Landi, Centro di Poesia Contemporanea, University of Bologna (2016).
Premio Letterario Internazionale L'Aquila Laudomia Bonanni, Italy (2019).
Emeritus Member, National System of Creative Artists, Mexico, since 1999
Honorary member, Hellenic Authors Society.

As an environmentalist:
Global 500 Award from the United Nations Environment Program on behalf of the Group of 100
Latin Trade magazine's Environmentalist of the Year
José Maria Morelos Medal, the state of Michoacan's highest award
John Hay Award from the Orion Society "for significant achievement in writing that addresses the relationship between people and nature", bestowed during a colloquium of writers and scientists in the Monarch Butterfly Biosphere Reserve in Mexico
Natural Resources Defense Council Force for Nature Award
•Green Cross Millennium Prize for International Environmental Leadership, given by Mikhail Gorbachev and Global Green (also awarded to his wife, Betty Ferber)

Bibliography

English
Blue Spaces/Los espacio azules, Selected Poems of Homero Aridjis, edited with an Introduction by Kenneth Rexroth, The Seabury Press, 1974
Exaltation of Light, Boa Editions, 1981 (translated by Eliot Weinberger)
Persephone, Aventura/Vintage Books, 1986 (translated by Betty Ferber)
1492: The Life and Times of Juan Cabezón of Castile, Summit Books, 1991 (translated by Betty Ferber)
The Lord of the Last Days: Visions of the Year 1000, William Morrow, 1995 (translated by Betty Ferber)
Eyes to See Otherwise/Ojos de otro mirar, selected and edited by Betty Ferber and George McWhirter, Carcanet, 2001, New Directions, 2002 (translated by Philip Lamantia, Kenneth Rexroth, W. S. Merwin, Jerome Rothenberg, George McWhirter, Lawrence Ferlinghetti, Eliot Weinberger)
Solar Poems/Los poemas solares, City Lights Publishers, 2010, English and Spanish (translated by George McWhirter)
Time of Angels/Tiempo de ángeles, City Lights Publishers, 2012 English and Spanish (translated by George McWhirter)
An Angel Speaks, The Swedenborg Society, London, 2015.
The Child Poet, Archipelago Books, New York, 2016 (translated by Chloe Aridjis).
Maria the Monarch, Mandel Vilar Press, Simsbury, CT, 2017 (translated by Eva Aridjis).
News of the Earth, Mandel Vilar Press, Simsbury, CT, 2017 (edited and translated by Betty Ferber).
Contributor to A New Divan: Lyrical Dialogue Between East and West, Gingko Library 2019. 
Smyrna in Flames, Mandel Vilar Press, Simsbury, CT, and Dryad Press, Takoma Park, MD, 2021 (translated by Lorna Scott Fox)

Spanish

Poetry
Los ojos desdoblados, Ed. La Palabra, Mexico, 1960.
Antes del reino, Ed. Era, Mexico, 1963.
Mirándola dormir, Ed. Joaquín Mortiz, Mexico, 1964.
Perséfone, Ed. Joaquín Mortiz, 1967.
Ajedrez-Navegaciones, Ed. Siglo XXI, Mexico, 1969.
Los espacios azules, Ed. Joaquín Mortiz, Mexico, 1969.
Quemar las naves, Ed. Joaquín Mortiz, Mexico, 1975.
Vivir para ver, Ed. Joaquín Mortiz, Mexico, 1977.
Construir la muerte, Ed. Joaquín Mortiz, Mexico, 1982.
Imágenes para el fin del milenio & Nueva expulsión del paraíso, Ed. Joaquín Mortiz, Mexico, 1990.
El poeta en peligro de extinción, Ediciones El Tucán de Virginia, Mexico, 1992.
Tiempo de ángeles, Espejo de Obsidiana, Mexico, 1994. English translation, Time of Angels, City Lights Publishers, San Francisco, 2012.
Ojos de otro mirar, Ediciones El Tucán de Virginia, Mexico, 1998.
El ojo de la ballena, Fondo de Cultura Económica, Mexico, 2001.
Los poemas solares, Fondo de Cultura Económica, Mexico, 2005. English translation, Solar Poems, City Lights Publishers, San Francisco, 2010.
Diario de sueños, Fondo de Cultura Económica, Mexico, 2011.
Del cielo y sus maravillas, de la tierra y sus miserias, Fondo de Cultura Económica, Mexico, 2013.
Esmirna en llamas, Fondo de Cultura Económica, Mexico, DF, 2013
La poesía llama, Fondo de Cultura Económica, Mexico, 2018.

Novels
La tumba de Filidor, Ed. La Palabra, Mexico, 1961.
El poeta niño, Fondo de Cultura Económica, Mexico, 1971.
El encantador solitario, Fondo de Cultura Económica, Mexico, 1972.
1492 vida y tiempos de Juan Cabezón de Castilla, Ed. Siglo XXI, Mexico, 1985.
Memorias del nuevo mundo, Editorial Diana, Mexico, 1988.
La leyenda de los soles, Fondo de Cultura Económica, Mexico, 1993.
El señor de los últimos días: Visiones del año mil, Alfaguara, Mexico, 1994.
¿En quién piensas cuando haces el amor?, Alfaguara, Mexico, 1996.
La montaña de las mariposas, Alfaguara, Mexico, 2000.
La zona del silencio, Alfaguara, Mexico, 2002.
El hombre que amaba el sol, Alfaguara, Mexico, 2005.
Sicarios, Alfaguara, Mexico, 2007.
Los invisibles, Fondo de Cultura Económica, Mexico, 2010.
Los perros del fin del mundo, Alfaguara, Mexico, 2012.
Esmirna en llamas, Fondo de Cultura Económica, Mexico, 2013.
Ciudad de zombis, Alfaguara, Mexico, 2014
Carne de Dios, Alfaguara, Mexico, 2015.
Los peones son el alma del juego, Alfaguara, Mexico, 2021.

Short fiction
Noche de independencia, Ed. Ultramar, Salvat, Madrid, 1978.
Playa nudista y otros relatos, Ed. Argos Vergara, Barcelona, 1982.
La Santa Muerte, Alfaguara, Mexico, 2004.

Drama
Espectáculo del año dos mil y Moctezuma, Ed. Joaquín Mortiz, México, 1981.
El último Adán, Ed. Joaquín Mortiz, México, 1986.
Gran teatro del fin del mundo, Joaquín Mortiz, México, 1989.

Non-fiction

Apocalipsis con figuras, Taurus, Mexico, 1997.
Noticias de la Tierra, with Betty Ferber, Random House Mondadori, Mexico, 2012.
Testamento del dragón, Alfaguara Penguin Random House, Mexico, 2018.
El nuevo Apocalipsis, Editorial Verbum, Madrid, 2020.

Children's books

El silencio de Orlando, Alfaguara Infantil, Mexico, 2000, Ediciones Castillo, Mexico, 2015.
El día de los perros locos, Alfguara Infantil, Mexico, 2003.
El tesoro de la noche triste (Vuelven los perros locos), Alfaguara Infantil, Mexico, 2005.
La búsqueda de Archelon: Odisea de las siete tortugas, Alfaguara, Mexico, 2006.
María la monarca, Ediciones Castillo, Mexico, 2015.

Poetry anthologies

Antología, Ed. Lumen, Barcelona, 1976.
Antología poética, Ocnos Editores, Barcelona, 1976.
Sobre una ausencia, Akal Editor, Madrid, 1977.
Obra poética 1960-1986, Ed. Joaquín Mortiz, Mexico, 1987.
Obra poética 1960-1990, Ed. Joaquín Mortiz, Mexico, 1991.
Antologia poetica 1960-1994, Fondo de Cultura Económica, Mexico, 1994.
Ojos de otro mirar: Poesía 1960-2001, Fondo de Cultura Económica, Mexico, 2002.
Infancia de luz, Ediciones SM, Mexico, 2003.
Antología poética, Fondo de Cultura Económica, Mexico, 2009.
Antología poética, 1960-2018, Ediciones Cátedra, Madrid, 2018.

Critical anthologies

Poesía en movimiento: México 1915-66, Ed. Siglo XXI, México, 1966, with Octavio Paz, Alí Chumacero and Jose Emilio Pacheco.
330 grabados originales de Manuel Manilla, Homero Aridjis y Arsacio Vanegas Arroyo, Editorial A. Vanegas Arroyo, Mexico, 1971.
Seis poetas latinoamericanos de hoy, Harcourt, Brace, Jovanovich, New York, 1972.
New Poetry of Mexico, E.H. Dutton, New York, 1972; Secker and Warburg, London, 1974.
Heimwee naar de dood: Zeven Mexicaanse dichters van deze eeuw, Meulenhoff, Amsterdam, 1974.
Savremena poezija Meksika, Bagdala, Belgrade, 1976.
Snabbare an tanken ror sig bilden: Modern Mexikansk poesi, with Pierre Zekeli, Fibs Lyrikklubs, Stockholm, 1979.
Antología del Primer Festival Internacional de Poesía, Morelia 1981, Ed. Joaquín Mortiz, Mexico 1982.
Antología del Festival Internacional de Poesía de la Ciudad de México, El Tucán de Virginia, Mexico, 1988.
Artistas e intelectuales sobre el Ecocidio Urbano, with Fernando Cesarman, Consejo de la Crónica de la Ciudad de México, Mexico, 1989.

Recordings

Recording of his poetry for the Library of Congress, Washington, D.C., 1966.
The World's Greatest Poets Reading at the Festival of Two Worlds, Spoleto, Italy, Spanish Poets, Volume I, Applause Productions, Inc., New York, 1968.
Homero Aridjis: antología poética, Voz Viva de México, UNAM, Mexico, 1969.
Poetry International 1973, Rotterdamse Kunststichting, Rotterdam, 1973.
Homero Aridjis: Ojos de otro mirar, Entre voces, Fondo de Cultura Económica, Mexico, 2003.

Further reading
Edenes subvertidos. La obra en prosa de Homero Aridjis, Laurence Pagacz, Bonilla Artigas, 2018
I tempi dell'apocalisse. L'opera di Homero Aridjis, Giuseppe Bellini, Bulzoni, 2013
Latin American Novels of the Conquest: Reinventing the New World/Kimberle S. Lopez, University of Missouri Press, 2002
El deseo colonial en 1492 y Memorias del Nuevo Mundo de Homero Aridjis/Kimberle s. Lopez, read at the Sexto Congreso de Literatura Mexicana Contemporánea, El Paso, Texas, March 1–4, 2001.
La luz queda en el aire, Estudios internacionales en torno a Homero Aridjis, ed. Thomas Stauder. Vervuert Verlag, 2005
Mexico in the 21st century: selected essays/Alina Camacho Rivero de Gingerich., 2003
Actualización de temas precolombinos en tres poetas contemporaneos Mexicanos/María Socorro Tabuenca Córdoba., 1979
Homero Aridjis: neoliberalismo y ficción narrativa en En quién piensas cuando haces el amor?/Stéphanie Valdés-Besson., 2005
El último Adán: Visión apocalíptica de la ciudad en la narrativa de Homero Aridjis, Lucia Guerra, Contexto, vol. 6, No. 8, 2002
La fantasia milenarista de Homero Aridjis, Summa crítica, Saul Yurkievich, Fondo de Cultura Económica, Mexico, 1997.

References

External links

www.cervantesvirtual.com/portales/homero_aridjis/

Biography from the international literature festival berlin Biography from the International Literature Festival Berlin
Group of 100
Homero Aridjis' 2009 publication from City Lights, Solar Poems
"El último Adán: Visión apocalíptica de la ciudad en la narrativa de Homero Aridjis"
Keynote Lecture: "The Birds, or My Life as a Writer and Environmentalist Activist"
PEN International
Enough! Mexico Is Ready to Explode
Migrants Ride a 'Train of Death' to Get to America & We're Ignoring the Root of the Problem
We're Mad as Hell, and We're Not Going to Take It Anymore
Last Call For Monarchs
40 Years Ago the World 'Discovered' Mexico's Monarch Habitat -- Today Its Survival Is at Stake
Charlie Hebdo Deserves the PEN Award. Censorship Is Complicity.
Instead Of Trump's Wall, Let's Build A Border Of Solar Panels
https://lareviewofbooks.org/article/a-poet-of-mythologies-homero-aridjis-at-80/
Homero Aridjis recorded at the Library of Congress for the Hispanic Division's audio literary archive on February 23, 1966. 

1940 births
Living people
Mexican people of Greek descent
PEN International
Prix Roger Caillois recipients
Mexican male poets
Writers from Michoacán
Mexican environmentalists
Mexican columnists
Ambassadors of Mexico to the Netherlands
Ambassadors of Mexico to Switzerland
Mexican expatriates in France